KRTX may refer to:

 KQUE (AM), a radio station (980 AM) licensed to serve Rosenburg-Richmond, Texas, United States, which held the call sign KRTX from 1997 to 2013
 KXXF, a radio station (105.3 FM) licensed to serve Winnie, Texas, which held the call sign KRTX from 1987 to 1996